The Kate's Basin Fire was a wildfire complex which began burning southwest of Thermopolis and north of Riverton in Hot Springs County, Wyoming. The fire started as a result of lightning.

During the fighting of the fire a burn over incident resulted in the death of James (Jim) Burnett of Hatfield, Arkansas, the Engine Boss of Oklahoma Engine #2.

References

External links
Pacific Northwest National Incident Management Team, Kate's Basin Fire Complex
Assessment of Summer 2000 Wildfires: Landscape History, Current Condition and Ownership
National Interagency Fire Center, 1997-2006 Large Fires (100,000+ fires)
Oklahoma Wildlands Firefighter Memorial
James Burnett Memorial Page
"Injured Oklahoma firefighter returned home", The Daily Ardmoreite, August 14, 2000
"Flare-up deadly for Arkansas firefighter", The Shawnee News-Star

2000 wildfires in the United States
Hot Springs County, Wyoming
Wildfires in Wyoming
2000 in Wyoming